In computational geometry, the minimum bounding rectangle (MBR), also known as bounding box (BBOX) or envelope, is an expression of the maximum extents of a two-dimensional object (e.g. point, line, polygon) or set of objects within its  coordinate system; in other words , , , . The MBR is a 2-dimensional case of the minimum bounding box.

MBRs are frequently used as an indication of the general position of a geographic feature or dataset, for either display, first-approximation spatial query, or spatial indexing purposes. 

The degree to which an "overlapping rectangles" query based on MBRs will be satisfactory (in other words, produce a low number of "false positive" hits) will depend on the extent to which individual spatial objects occupy (fill) their associated MBR. If the MBR is full or nearly so (for example, a mapsheet aligned with axes of latitude and longitude will normally entirely fill its associated MBR in the same coordinate space), then the "overlapping rectangles" test will be entirely reliable for that and similar spatial objects. On the other hand, if the MBR describes a dataset consisting of a diagonal line, or a small number of disjunct points (patchy data), then most of the MBR will be empty and an "overlapping rectangles" test will produce a high number of false positives. One system that attempts to deal with this problem, particularly for patchy data, is c-squares.

MBRs are also an essential prerequisite for the R-tree method of spatial indexing.

As spatial metadata
Owing to their simplicity of expression and ease of use for searching, MBRs (frequently as "bounding box" or "bounding coordinates") are also commonly included in relevant standards for geospatial metadata, i.e. metadata that describes spatial (geographic) objects; examples include DCMI Box as an extension to the Dublin Core metadata scheme, "Bounding Coordinates" in the (U.S.) FGDC metadata standard, and "Geographic Bounding Box" in the (2003–current) ISO 19115 Metadata Standard for geographic information (ISO/TC 211). It is also (as "boundingBox") an element in Geography Markup Language (GML), that is utilised by a range of Web Service specifications from the Open Geospatial Consortium (OGC). In the ISO 19107 Spatial Schema (ISO/TC 211), MBR appears as the datatype GM_Envelope that is returned by the envelope() operation on the root class GM_Object.

Web-accessible articles that deal further with the concept of the MBR include "Unlocking the Mysteries of the Bounding Box" by Douglas R. Caldwell, and "Geographic Database Search Interfaces and the Equatorial Cylindrical Equidistant Projection" by Ross S. Swick and Kenneth W. Knowles. The section on "searching" on the Geospatial Methods site is also well worth investigating. See also documentation for specific spatially enabled databases, e.g.

See also
Bounding parallelogram
C-squares
Darboux integral
Elongatedness
Geographic information system
Geospatial metadata
Largest empty rectangle, also known as maximal empty rectangle
Minimum bounding box
R-tree
Shapefile
Spatial index
Convex hull

References

External links
Geospatial Methods website

Cartography
Geometric algorithms